1965 in Korea may refer to:
1965 in North Korea
1965 in South Korea